Vesta Creek is a stream in the County of Northern Lights in Northern Alberta, Canada. It is in the Mackenzie River drainage basin and is a right tributary of the Keg River.

References

Rivers of Alberta